Kataleya & Kandle  is a Ugandan music duo consisting of the Kataleya & Kandle. The duo holds the distinction of being Uganda's first female music duo.  They are managed by  Theron Music  Records since 2021.

History
Before joining the music industry, Kataleya and Kandle met each other at a birthday party and became close  friends. Kataleya and Kandle competed in a music competition before receiving the once-in-a-lifetime opportunity that altered their lives. They were discovered and signed by a music and events label in 2021. Kataleya and Kandle hit the Ugandan  music market as the new  female singing duo with the release of their debut single "Muzibe wa Love" in 2021 after joining Theron Music. Kataleya and Kandle are Uganda's first female musical duo.

Kataleya
Born as Namakula Hadijah on 19 December 1999. She attended  Apostolic Primary School, Mengo then Noah's Ark lugazi for her High School certificate.

Kandle
Nabatuusa Rebecca (born 22 February 1998)  commonly known as Kandle, she studied from  Bunamwaya C/U Primary School and Kyambogo College for her high school education.

Discography

 Kyolina 2022
 Nkunonya 2022
 Pain Killer 2022
 Do Me  2021 
 Tonnafuya 2021 
 Muzibe wa Love 2021

References

External references
Gorgeous Upcoming Singers Kataleya And Kandle Pursuing Their Music Dream With Focus – Chano8
Kataleya And Kandle Uganda’s Next Singing Duo. • The Campus Times
Ugandans sturned by Duo Kataleya and Kandle
Music Review: Nkunonya – Kataleya & Kandle
Kampala’s hottest girl duo to drop ‘TONNAFUYA’ single. | swagg.co.ug

Kataleya and Kandle; the new female duo bossing airwaves

Ugandan musical groups
Musical groups established in 2021
2021 establishments in Uganda
Girl groups
Ugandan women singers
Musical trios